Nangal Dam Ambala Passenger is a Passenger express train of the Indian Railways connecting Ambala Cantonment Junction in Haryana and  Nangal Dam in Punjab. It is currently being operated with 64514/64515 train numbers on daily basis.

Route and halts

Average speed and frequency
The train runs with an average speed of 40 km/h and completes 158 km in 4 hrs. The train runs on a twice a day.

See also 

 Nangal Dam railway station
 Ambala Cantonment Junction railway station

External links 
 Ambala Nangaldam Passenger
 Nangaldam Ambala Passenger

References

Rail transport in Haryana
Slow and fast passenger trains in India